Devil in Me is the debut studio album by British singer and songwriter Natalie Duncan. It was released by Verve Records on 16 July 2012. The album explores a vast range of music genres including soul, jazz, blues and classical. Duncan has stated influences on the album as being Nina Simone, Alicia Keys, Pink Floyd and others.

History
Recording sessions for the album began in 2011. The album was recorded in its entirety at Peter Gabriel's Real World Studios in Box, Wiltshire, England. The album was produced by Joe Henry.

Track listing

Singles 
 "Sky Is Falling"
 "Find Me a Home"

Personnel 
All tracks produced by Joe Henry (except tracks 7 and 14, produced by Duncan). 
All tracks mixed by Stampede Origin, Los Angeles, CA. Mastered at Lurssen Master by Gavin Lurssen in Los Angeles, CA (except tracks 7 and 14). 
Tracks 7 and 14 were recorded at The Engine Room, London. 
Recording engineer is Patrick Phillips (except tracks 7, 13 and 14). 
Assistant recording engineer is Jose Gomes (except tracks 7, 13 and 14). 
Recording engineer and mixer (tracks 7 and 14) is Mark Bishop.

All tracks:
Vocal and piano – Natalie Duncan

All tracks (except 7 and 14):
Acoustic and electric guitar – John Smith
Electric guitar – Patrick Warren
Upright and bass guitar – Greg Cohen
Drums and percussion – Earl Harvin 
Backing vocals – Hattie Whitehead

Tracks 7 and 14:
Drums – Glyn Daniels 
Guitar – Tom Varrall 
Double bass – Henry Guy
Backing vocals – Hattie Whitehead

Additional tracks:
Electric guitar – Tom Varrall (tracks 4, 6, 7, 8, 11 and 14)
Backing vocals – Tom Varrall (track 6)
Trombone – Lucy Wilkins (track 8)
String section (tracks 2, 6, 8 and 9):
First violin and section leader – Lucy Wilkins 
Violin – Howard Gott
Viola – Rachel Robson 
Cello – Sarah Willson
Trombone and euphonium – Mike Kearsey 
Strings and horns arranged by Patrick Warren

Notes and references 

2012 debut albums
Albums produced by Joe Henry
Verve Records albums